Archigraptis is a genus of moths belonging to the subfamily Tortricinae of the family Tortricidae.

Species
Archigraptis chrysodesma (Diakonoff, 1952)
Archigraptis haemorrhaga Tuck, 1988
Archigraptis limacina Razowski, 1964
Archigraptis limacinoides Kuznetzov, 1992
Archigraptis rosei Tuck, 1988
Archigraptis stauroma (Diakonoff, 1968)
Archigraptis strigifera Tuck, 1988

See also
List of Tortricidae genera

References

 , 2005: World Catalogue of Insects vol. 5 Tortricidae.
 , 1968 Microlepidoptera of the Philippine Islands. United States National Museum Bulletin, 257: 7–100, 300–337, 414–425. Full article: 
 , 1964, Discussion of Some Groups of Tortricini (Tortricidae, Lepidoptera) with Descriptions of New Genera and Species. Acta Zoologica Cracoviensia, 9(5): 357–416.
 , 1988: A taxonomic revision of the genera Polemograptis Meyrick, and Archigraptis Razowski (Lepidoptera: Tortricidae). Systematic Entomology 13 (1): 115–129. Abstract: .

External links
Tortricid.net

Tortricini
Tortricidae genera